Audrey Tcheuméo (born 20 April 1990) is a French judoka. She won a bronze medal in the women's −78 kg event at the 2012 Summer Olympics in London. She has also won medals at the World Judo Championships and European Judo Championships.

She won the gold medal in her event at the 2022 Judo Grand Slam Paris held in Paris, France.

She is of Cameroonian heritage.

References

External links

 
 
 
 
 
 Profile at L'Équipe 

French female judoka
French sportspeople of Cameroonian descent
1990 births
Living people
Judoka at the 2012 Summer Olympics
Judoka at the 2016 Summer Olympics
Olympic judoka of France
Olympic silver medalists for France
Olympic bronze medalists for France
Olympic medalists in judo
Medalists at the 2012 Summer Olympics
Medalists at the 2016 Summer Olympics
Knights of the Ordre national du Mérite
Sportspeople from Bondy
European Games competitors for France
Judoka at the 2015 European Games
21st-century French women